César Luís dos Santos Camargo, known as César Santos (born 21 March 1969) is a former Brazilian football player. He also holds Portuguese citizenship.

Club career
He made his Primeira Liga debut for Beira-Mar on 21 August 1998 in a game against Braga.

Honours
Beira-Mar
Taça de Portugal: 1998–99

References

External links
 

1969 births
Living people
Brazilian footballers
Standard Liège players
Brazilian expatriate footballers
Expatriate footballers in Belgium
Belgian Pro League players
RFC Liège players
Louletano D.C. players
S.C. Beira-Mar players
Liga Portugal 2 players
Primeira Liga players
Imortal D.C. players
U.S.C. Paredes players
F.C. Marco players
SC São João de Ver players
Association football forwards